David Arthur Gaines (January 20, 1963 - May 16, 1990) was a NASCAR Limited Sportsman Division race car driver from Goldston, North Carolina. 

He was killed in a practice session at Lowes Motor Speedway. In a five-car wreck involving Ted Comstock and Terri Sawyer, David Gaines' car had slowed for the wreck of two cars in front of him, but was hit from the rear by Peter Gibbons. Gaines' car stopped in the middle of the track and was hit broadside by Steve McEachern.

References

Sources

NASCAR drivers
1963 births
1990 deaths
People from Chatham County, North Carolina
Racing drivers from North Carolina
Racing drivers who died while racing
Sports deaths in North Carolina
Filmed deaths in motorsport